The South African Railways Class 6H  of 1901 was a steam locomotive from the pre-Union era in the Cape of Good Hope.

In 1901, 21 6th Class 4-6-0 steam locomotives were placed in service by the Cape Government Railways, built to the older 6th Class designs with plate frames. In 1912, when they were assimilated into the South African Railways, they were renumbered and designated .

Manufacturer
The original Cape 6th Class locomotive was designed at the Salt River works of the Cape Government Railways (CGR), at the same time as the 7th Class.

Three new versions of the 6th Class locomotive entered service on the CGR in 1901, two American-built and one British-built. The British version was built by Neilson, Reid and Company, who delivered 21 engines. With these locomotives, CGR Chief Locomotive Superintendent H.M. Beatty kept to the older plate frame design, but fitted the larger type of cab. These locomotives were also equipped with the  diameter cylinders which had been used on all previous 6th Class locomotives with the exception of the Class 6G. Another similarity to the early 6th Class locomotives was their lower running boards with fairings or splashers over the coupled wheels.

Upon delivery, nine of them were numbered in the range from 278 to 286 and allocated to the Western System of the CGR. The other twelve were numbered in the range from 601 to 612 for the Midland System, but later renumbered in the range from 541 to 552.

Drummond tubes
One of these locomotives, the Western System's no. 286, was an experimental locomotive, equipped with Drummond water tubes in the firebox and a very large panelled cab. Drummond tubes involved the installation of cross-water tubes in the firebox, as featured on the London and South Western Railway's T9 Class and L11 Class, in an attempt to increase the heating surface area of the water, albeit at the cost of increased boiler complexity. On CGR no. 286, as built, visible exterior evidence of the presence of Drummond tubes was rectangular covers attached to the sides of the firebox just ahead of the cab.

In service, it was found that the tubes did not affect the steaming capacity of the boiler to any significant extent. Instead, the tubes were inclined to leak and were difficult to maintain. It was therefore not long before the tubes were removed. At the same time, the cab was changed to the standard type, as used on the other twenty locomotives.

Class 6 sub-classes
When the Union of South Africa was established on 31 May 1910, the three Colonial government railways (CGR, Natal Government Railways and Central South African Railways) were united under a single administration to control and administer the railways, ports and harbours of the Union. Although the South African Railways and Harbours came into existence in 1910, the actual classification and renumbering of all the rolling stock of the three constituent railways were only implemented with effect from 1 January 1912.

When these locomotives were assimilated into the South African Railways (SAR) in 1912, they were renumbered in the range from 614 to 634 and designated .

The rest of the CGR's 6th Class locomotives, together with the Central South African Railways (CSAR) Classes 6-L1 to 6-L3 locomotives which had been inherited from the Oranje-Vrijstaat Gouwerment-Spoorwegen (OVGS) via the Imperial Military Railways (IMR), were grouped into thirteen more sub-classes by the SAR. The  locomotives became SAR Classes 6, 6A to 6G and 6J to 6L, the  locomotives became Class 6Y and the  locomotives became .

Service
The Class 6 family of locomotives were introduced primarily as passenger locomotives, but when the class became displaced by larger and more powerful locomotive classes, it literally became a Jack-of-all-trades. It went on to see service in all parts of the country, except in Natal, and was used on all types of traffic.

After the Simon's Town line in Cape Town was electrified in 1928, Class 6H engines that used to haul commuters on this line became dock shunting engines in Table Bay Harbour. This continued until they were gradually replaced by new Class S2 0-8-0 shunting engines from 1952.

Renumbering
The table lists the Class 6H works numbers and renumbering.

Commemoration
A 25c postage stamp which depicted a Class 6H locomotive was one of a set of four commemorative postage stamps which were issued by the South African Post Office on 27 April 1983 to commemorate the steam locomotives of South Africa, which were rapidly being withdrawn from service at the time. The artwork and stamp design was by the noted stamp designer and artist Hein Botha. 

The particular locomotive depicted was ex CGR (Midland System) 6th Class no. 605, renumbered to CGR no. 545 and later SAR Class 6H no. 627, which was withdrawn from service in 1971 and plinthed at the Mafikeng Museum in 1972. The outline of a traditional SAR locomotive number plate was used on the date of release as a commemorative cancellation for De Aar.

Illustration
The main picture and the following show the differences in appearance of the Class 6H during its service life, with different cabs, headlights and cowcatcher designs.

References

1390
1390
4-6-0 locomotives
2′C n2 locomotives
Neilson Reid locomotives
Cape gauge railway locomotives
Railway locomotives introduced in 1901
1901 in South Africa
Scrapped locomotives